Takeover Records is a punk rock record label based in Long Beach, California, United States. The company was founded by former Yellowcard guitarist Ben Harper and his friend Greg McDonald in 1997.

Artists

Current
Bracket
HeyMike!
River City High
Strike.Fire.Fall
End of Pipe
The Wistful Larks
Grounds
Parader

Former
Craig's Brother
GK & The Renegades
Goodbye Soundscape
The Crack Brothers of Dirty Jew Town
Inspection 12
Near Miss
Oh No Not Stereo
Stole Your Woman
Yellowcard (early material only)
Lies Like Me
Lose The Name
Safari So Good
A Good Night Sound Rush
The Upset Victory
Paperface
Versus the Ocean
Infrasonic asylum
Oh Romeo!
A Phoenix Forever (digital only)
Love It or Leave It (digital only)
 iLLFX

See also
 List of record labels

References

PunkNews.org - Takeover Records
Europunk - Takeover Records’ Third Annual “Sign My Band” Contest
Vegas Archive: Love It Or Leave It – Discography 2006-2011

External links
Takeover Records To Support Ten Unsigned Bands With "Sign My Band" Contest
Takeover Records Myspace

Record labels established in 1997
Punk record labels
American independent record labels